Dornheim is a municipality in the district Ilm-Kreis, in Thuringia, Germany.

The main attraction is the village church where the composer Johann Sebastian Bach was married in 1707.

References

Ilm-Kreis
Schwarzburg-Sondershausen